Joseph Wilby (1912 – 1999) was a male boxer who competed for England.

Boxing career
Wilby represented England and won a bronze medal in the 81 kg division at the 1938 British Empire Games in Sydney, New South Wales, Australia. He captained the boxing team during the Games. Wilby won the Amateur Boxing Association 1937 light heavyweight title, when boxing for the Royal Air Force.

He later coached the British boxing team.

Personal life
He was in the Royal Air Force and stationed at No 3 (A) Wing a RAF Halton, Buckinghamshire during 1938. IN 1949 he was living in Sleaford and was a Warrant officer.

References

1912 births
1999 deaths
English male boxers
Boxers at the 1938 British Empire Games
Commonwealth Games medallists in boxing
Commonwealth Games bronze medallists for England
Light-heavyweight boxers
Medallists at the 1938 British Empire Games